Jake Ferguson (born January 18, 1999) is an American football tight end for the Dallas Cowboys of the National Football League (NFL). He played college football at the University of Wisconsin.

High school career
Ferguson attended Vel Phillips Memorial High School in Madison, Wisconsin. He played wide receiver and linebacker in high school. During his career he had 1,795 receiving yards and 15 touchdowns on offense and 314 tackles, five sacks and five interceptions on defense. He committed to the University of Wisconsin to play college football.

College career
Ferguson played at Wisconsin from 2017 to 2021. After redshirting his first year in 2017, he played in 47 games over the next four years, recording 145 receptions for 1,618 yards and 13 touchdowns. As a senior he broke Lee Evans' school record for consecutive games with a reception.

College statistics

Professional career

Ferguson was drafted by the Dallas Cowboys in the fourth round, the 129th selection overall, of the 2022 NFL Draft.

Personal life
Ferguson's grandfather is former Wisconsin head coach Barry Alvarez; Alvarez was also an athletic director for the university.

References

External links
 Dallas Cowboys bio
Wisconsin Badgers bio

Living people
Players of American football from Wisconsin
Sportspeople from Madison, Wisconsin
American football tight ends
Wisconsin Badgers football players
1999 births
Dallas Cowboys players